James Chaffee Loomis (April 29, 1807 – September 16, 1877) was an American lawyer and politician.

Loomis, eldest son of James and Abigail S. (Chaffee) Loomis, of Windsor, Connecticut, was born in Windsor, April 29, 1807.  He graduated from Yale College in 1828. On his graduation, he began the study of law in the University of Virginia, but returned the next year to Connecticut, where he pursued his studies, first in the school connected with this college, and later in Norwalk with Hon. Clark Bissell. In 1832 he was admitted to the bar of Fairfield County, and settled in practice with Hon Samuel B. Sherwood, of Saugatuck, now Westport. He removed to Bridgeport in 1840, and before many years his business became more extensive than that of any of his associates in the county. He also took an active part in public affairs, was early elected to the Connecticut State Senate (serving in 1837-38 as an ex-officio member of the corporation of Yale), and repeatedly afterwards to the lower house of the Connecticut State Legislature. He was in 1861 and 1862 the unsuccessful candidate of the Democratic party for the governorship. About 1870 he retired from the active practice of his profession, to devote himself to the care of his large estate and to the interests of the various corporations and public trusts with which he was connected. At the time of his death, he was President of the County Bar Association, of the City Board of Education, of the Mountain Grove Cemetery, and of the Bridgeport Library Association. Loomis went from home on August 18, 1877, to South Egremont, Massachusetts, with the intention of spending some weeks there in rest. He was attacked two days later with a gastric fever, from the effects of which he died, in that town, Sept. 16, at the age of 70.

He was first married, May 1, 1833, to Eliza C Mitchell, of New Haven, who died March 24, 1840. He was again married, Apr. 24, 1844, to Mary B., daughter of Ira Sherman, of Bridgeport, who survived him. His children—one son by the first marriage, and one son and one daughter by the second marriage—all died before him. The younger son was at the time of his death (in October, 1867) a member of the Senior Class of Yale.

External links

People from Windsor, Connecticut
Yale College alumni
University of Virginia School of Law alumni
Connecticut lawyers
Democratic Party Connecticut state senators
Democratic Party members of the Connecticut House of Representatives
1807 births
1877 deaths
19th-century American politicians
Burials at Mountain Grove Cemetery, Bridgeport
19th-century American lawyers